

Coal Mining
The coal industry came to Kent in 1912 and Betteshanger Colliery started production in 1927 and was the largest of the Kent collieries. It was the last Kent colliery to close, closing for good in 1989. The colliery was served by a railway branch which left the main line between Deal & Sandwich.

Betteshanger History
Rugby was first played at Betteshanger (The Colliers) in 1936, and was disbanded in 1939 at the outbreak of World War II. The club reformed in season 1948-49 when the Yorkshire and Lancashire rugby league enthusiasts combined with the Welsh exiles. The Colliers were highly respected throughout their 57-year history winning county 7’s championship twice, as well as Kent 2, Kent 1 and London Div.4 SE.

Deal Wanderers History

Deal Wanderers started life as Walmer Wanderers in season 1958-59. The change of name came in season 1960-61 when it separated from the cricket section. Wanderers won Kent Div.3 in the 2004-2005 Season, which was a fitting prelude of what the future had in store.

Deal & Betteshanger History
Following closure of Betteshanger Colliery and the RM barracks both clubs found themselves competing for an ever-decreasing pool of players and in 2004 the two clubs engaged in discussion about amalgamation. Although they had very different backgrounds and histories the joining of the clubs was the right decision and in 2006 Deal and Betteshanger Lions RFC was born, and has proved very successful.

The Club is one of the very few sides at Level 7 that play predominantly home grown talent blended with a few players that have moved into the area. The club endeavours to field three regular senior sides. The club also has a thriving mini’s and junior section where we coach all children from 6 to 17 years. The coaches work hard to ensure the clubs ethos of teamwork, respect, enjoyment and discipline, are values to be aspired to at all times. Deal and Betteshanger was one of the first Rugby Clubs in East Kent to be awarded the coveted “Seal of Approval”.

Royal Marines School of Music Barracks Bombing
The rugby club had a strong association with the Royal Marines School of Music, then barracked in Walmer, and the tragic IRA bombing in 1989 killed 11 students, several of whom played for the Wanderers. The community of Deal & Walmer was distraught and in commemoration of that day, an annual rugby match takes place, alternately hosted by the Lions at The Drill Field and by the Royal Marines Band Service in Portsmouth.

Junior Rugby

The club runs a thriving Youth section, made up of a minis with age groups from 6 to 11 year olds and Juniors with age groups from 12 to 17 years old. Training and matches take place on Sunday mornings from 10.00am

Saracens Partnership 

For the start of the 2015-2016 Deal & Betteshanger rugby club have become a partner club with Saracens.  Saracens provide club visits as well as lectures and pro sessions along with providing an opportunity for Youth players to take part in fixtures at Allianz Park Stadium on the 4G pitch itself while the crowd builds for the game.

CBRE All Schools Partnership 

For the start of the 2016-2017 Deal & Betteshanger rugby club are part of the CBRE All Schools Partnership, along with Deal school Goodwin Academy. The rugby club provides the ground for training and any matches which the school take part in. The Deal & Betteshanger club logo is shown on the school rugby shirts.

Club Alumni

Several players have come through the junior section at Deal & Betteshanger and moved into professional positions within rugby. These include Matthew Carley, a professional RFU coach, Danny Herriott who played for England U21 and Ross Widdett who played for 2022 Mid-American RFU (MARFU) winners St Louis Bombers.

Club honors

Kent 2 champions (2): 1987–88, 1995–96
London 4 South East champions: 2001–02
Kent 3 champions: 2004–05
Kent Plate winners: 2009

Notes

References

External links
Official website
Official Twitter Account
Deal & Betteshanger on Facebook
Official Youth Twitter Account
Deal & Betteshanger Youth Rugby on Facebook

English rugby union teams